"Woodland Critter Christmas" is the 125th episode of the Comedy Central series South Park. It originally aired on December 15, 2004. It was the last episode of the series to have a Christmas theme for ten years until 2014's "#HappyHolograms". This is also the last episode where Mr. Garrison presented as male for a stretch of time, as he came out as a trans woman between season 9 and the season 12 episode “Eek, a Penis!'.

Plot
This episode, like many routine Christmas specials, has a rhyming narration akin to a storybook. It begins in a forest, where Stan discovers a group of talking animals, known as the Woodland Critters, consisting of Squirrely the Squirrel, Rabbity the Rabbit, Raccoony the Raccoon, Beavery the Beaver, Beary the Bear, Porcupiney the Porcupine, Skunky the Skunk, Foxy the Fox, Deery the Deer, Woodpeckery the Woodpecker, Mousey the Mouse, and Chickadee-y the Chickadee are building a Christmas tree. They convince a surprised but apathetic Stan to help make a star for it, after which he goes home. That night, they wake him in his room and explain that Porcupiney is pregnant with the creatures' savior. Though drowsy and annoyed, Stan agrees to help them build a manger for the baby. As he finishes, however, another problem appears in the form of a mountain lion, which apparently eats every pregnant Critter to prevent their Savior's birth. Exasperated, Stan goes to the cave where the mountain lion lives and manages to kill it, but is dismayed to learn that the lion was the mother of three newly orphaned cubs. He is further horrified to learn that the Woodland Critters are actually Satanists and that their "Savior" is the Antichrist. They celebrate Stan's victory by sacrificing Rabbity, devouring his flesh, and having an orgy in his blood.

Stan tries to ignore the impending apocalypse, only to be goaded by the narrator into trying to stop it. Unfortunately, the Critters are able to rebuff him with their Satanic powers, which will apparently grow stronger as the Antichrist's birth approaches. Since the Critters claim that only a mountain lion can prevent that, Stan, heeding the narrator's instructions, returns to the mountain to enlist the orphaned cubs. Since they're too small to take on the Critters, they can only stop the birth by learning to perform an abortion. The narrator forces Stan to take them to an abortion clinic for lessons, despite his objections. Meanwhile, the Critters are searching for an unbaptized human host for the Antichrist to possess once it's born. They discover Kyle, who reveals to the Critters that he doesn't celebrate Christmas because he is Jewish, and lure him into the forest.

Stan and the cubs return to the forest only to discover that the Antichrist, a hairless, jabbering little creature, has already been born, with Kyle tied to a Satanic altar. Santa Claus arrives and, when he learns what is happening, pulls out a shotgun and kills all of the Critters. He explains that the Antichrist will die without a human host to inhabit, but Kyle, having been freed, suddenly decides to allow the Antichrist to possess him. He declares that he will conquer the world in the name of the Jews, allowing them to finally take control of Christmas once and for all.

The scene suddenly cuts to Mr. Garrison's fourth grade class, revealing that the entire episode up until now has been a Christmas themed story narrated by Cartman for a school assignment. Kyle objects to its blatant anti-Semitism, and Mr. Garrison, fearing complaints from Kyle's mother, forces Cartman to stop reading. However, the rest of the class want to hear how the story ends and plead with Kyle to let Cartman finish. Kyle objects that the ending is obvious, as he assumes Santa Claus will simply kill him, thus saving Christmas. Cartman insists that the ending is different, and a begrudging Kyle gives in to the pleas of his classmates and allows Cartman to continue.

Back in the story, Kyle becomes horrified at how evil the Antichrist feels and begs the others to exorcise it before it takes control of him. Thinking quickly, Stan has the lion cubs perform an abortion through Kyle's anus, and Santa smashes it with a sledgehammer. Santa gives Stan a special Christmas wish, which he uses to resurrect the mother mountain lion, who is happily reunited with her cubs. Everyone then goes home to a happy Christmas. Cartman concludes, "they all lived happily ever after...except for Kyle, who died of AIDS two weeks later," with an image of a sickly Kyle dying in a hospital. The episode ends with "The End" while Kyle can be heard angrily shouting "Goddamn it, Cartman!"

Production
According to Trey Parker and Matt Stone on the DVD commentary, this episode was one of the most difficult to make. After making the 13 other episodes from the eighth season of South Park and the movie Team America: World Police all in 2004, a year which Parker and Stone describe as "The Year from Hell", the two men and the writing staff were completely drained of ideas. They tried to come up with an idea, but nothing came up through Thursday and Friday, which was considered a huge setback due to the show's rushed production schedule. So troubled was the production that Parker considered calling Comedy Central to inform them that they would not have an episode to air on the forthcoming Wednesday. On Saturday morning, they decided to just do the idea of parodying John Denver and the Muppets: A Christmas Together holiday special, which had been in gestation for some time. Parker was initially against doing another Christmas episode, as he felt the material was not good enough to match the success of the show's previous Christmas-themed episodes. With the Wednesday deadline looming, Parker had no choice but to follow through with the idea. Later that afternoon, the writers had a breakthrough with the idea of depicting the Critters as Satanic worshippers, as well as satirizing the blood orgy scene from the 1997 movie Event Horizon. By Sunday, the episode developed into a storyline featuring a rhyming narration in the style of How the Grinch Stole Christmas, and ending with the twist reveal of being a story told by Cartman to his classmates. Parker recalled how, while driving home later that evening, he spontaneously "roared like a lion" upon the realization that not only would there be an episode completed in time, but one satisfactory enough to end the season on a high note.

Home media
"Woodland Critter Christmas", along with the thirteen other episodes from South Park'''s 8th season, were released on a three-disc DVD set in the United States on August 29, 2006. The sets included brief audio commentaries by Parker and Stone for each episode. IGN gave the season a 9/10.

On November 13, 2007, the episode was released on the compilation DVD Christmas Time In South Park. The episode is also included as a bonus on the DVD for the standalone film Imaginationland: The Movie''.

References

External links
 "Woodland Critter Christmas" Full episode at South Park Studios
 

2004 American television episodes
Television episodes about abortion
American Christmas television episodes
Fiction about the Devil
Fictional depictions of the Antichrist
Santa Claus in television
Television episodes about Satanism
South Park (season 8) episodes
Television episodes about demonic possession
Talking animals in fiction
Television episodes about murder
Horror television episodes